Eddie Condon's Jazz Concerts is an American old-time radio program featuring Dixieland and jazz music. It was broadcast on the Blue Network from May 20, 1944, to April 7, 1945.

Format
In 1942, musician Eddie Condon began staging concerts in New York City, with Carnegie Hall and Town Hall as venues. By 1944, the performances were sold out. In 1944, the Blue Network began broadcasting the concerts, which The Directory of the Armed Forces Radio Service Series described as "Jazz music of a high standard". The broadcasts began "about eight performances into the series".

The program typically began with a jazz song, after which Condon commented on the song and introduced the band's members. The network described the programs as "the only unrehearsed, free-wheeling, completely barefoot music on the air."

Personnel
Condon was the program's host, with broadcasts featuring what the Encyclopedia of Great Popular Song Recordings called "many of the era's greatest musicians". Among them was singer Lee Wiley, described in the encyclopedia as "a near-regular" on the show. The broadcasts found Condon "surrounded by the greatest names in jazz—Louis Armstrong, Jack Teagarden, Willie “The Lion” Smith and Bob Haggart."

Jack Bland and Addison Amore were the directors, and Ernest Anderson was the producer.

Recordings
The broadcasts of Eddie Condon's Jazz Concerts have been made available commercially by Jazzology, creating "jazz's time capsule [that] lives on through the Golden Age of Radio".

References

External links

Logs
Log of episodes of Eddie Condon's Jazz Concerts from The Digital Deli Too
Log of episodes of Eddie Condon's Jazz Concerts from Old Time Radio Researchers Group
Log of episodes of Eddie Condon's Jazz Concerts from radioGOLDINdex

Streaming
Episodes of Eddie Condon's Jazz Concerts from Old Time Radio Researchers Group Library

American jazz radio programs
1944 radio programme debuts
1945 radio programme endings
1940s American radio programs
NBC Blue Network radio programs
American music radio programs